"Mi enfermedad" (lit. "My Disease") is a song written by Argentine singer-songwriter Andres Calamaro, originally recorded and released as a single separately by the Argentine rock singer Fabiana Cantilo 1991 and Calamaro's Spanish-Argentine band Los Rodríguez. The song was a favourite of Diego Maradona, who was facing drug-related problems back then. Reportedly journalists asked him if it was dedicated to him. In 2019 Mexican singer Alejandra Guzmán released a version of the song as a single.

References

1991 songs
Songs written by Andrés Calamaro